The Europe Zone was one of the four zones within Group 3 of the regional Davis Cup competition in 2014. The zone's competition was held in round robin format in Szeged, Hungary in May 2014. The twelve competing nations were divided into four pools of three. The winners from each pool played off to determine the two nations to be promoted to Europe/Africa Zone Group II in 2015, while the second and third placed nations played to off to determine overall placings within the group.

Participating nations

Draw

The twelve teams were divided into four pools of three. The winner of Pool A plays off against the winner of Pool C, and the winner of Pool B plays off against the winner of Pool D. The two winners of these play-offs are promoted to Europe/Africa Zone Group II in 2016. The second and third placed teams in each pool play off in the same pattern to determine overall rankings within the group.

The group was staged from 7 to 10 May 2015 at the Gellért Szabadidőközpont in Szeged, Hungary.

Pool A

Pool B

Pool C

Pool D

First round

Pool A

Hungary vs. Armenia

Hungary vs. Liechtenstein

Armenia vs. Liechtenstein

Pool B

Macedonia vs. Malta

Macedonia vs. Albania

Malta vs. Albania

Pool C

Georgia vs. Montenegro

Georgia vs. Iceland

Montenegro vs. Iceland

Pool D

Estonia vs. Turkey

Turkey vs. San Marino

Estonia vs. San Marino

Play-offs

Promotion

Hungary vs. Georgia

Macedonia vs. Turkey

5th to 8th play-offs

Liechtenstein vs. Montenegro

Malta vs. Estonia

9th to 12th play-offs

Armenia vs. Iceland

Albania vs. San Marino

Outcomes
The remaining ten nations remain in Europe Zone Group III in 2015

References

2014 Davis Cup Europe/Africa Zone
Davis Cup Europe/Africa Zone